Benigno Gutiérrez Valdivia (born 1 September 1925, date of death unknown) was a Bolivian football forward who played for Bolivia in the 1950 FIFA World Cup. Gutiérrez is deceased.

Career
Gutiérrez played at the 1949 South American Championship. He also played for Club Litoral.

References

External links

FIFA profile

1925 births
Year of death missing
Bolivian footballers
Bolivia international footballers
Association football forwards
Club Deportivo Litoral (Cochabamba) players
1949 South American Championship players
1950 FIFA World Cup players